Carrsbrook is an unincorporated community in Albemarle County, Virginia.

Confederate Maj. Gen. J.E.B. Stuart's "Horse Company" and Confederate infantrymen were stationed in a camp near the Rivanna River at Carrsbrook during the Civil War.  Union Brig. Gen. George A. Custer's men raided the camp under fire from Confederate forces.  See Battle of Rio Hill.

References

Unincorporated communities in Virginia
Unincorporated communities in Albemarle County, Virginia